Lucidity is an annual, three-day transformational festival in Santa Barbara, California.

The festival's name alludes to lucid dreams; the events producers encourage attendees to "awake in [their] dreams".

The event has been compared to Burning Man, Coachella Valley Music and Arts Festival, Lightning in a Bottle, Electric Daisy Carnival, and the San Francisco New Year’s Eve event Sea of Dreams.

It features performance arts and music stages featuring bands, spoken word artists, dancers and DJs. There is a large vendor area, including a focus on local foods, jewelry, clothing and sustainable goods.

Live Oak Campground has been the site of many other music festivals, such as Lightning in a Bottle, from 2006–2008, until that event outgrew the venue.

Lucidity went on hiatus since 2020, although virtual festivals were held.

Vision and environmental ethic

Much of the ethic of the event is rooted in the general philosophy of "burners". The event sponsored a "Greenest Campsite" contest and a motto of "Leave It Better". There were copious reminders to pack out trash and constant activity to remove trash and keep the grounds looking well.

According to Daphne Carpenter, the festival was organized around "six themed villages that revolve around archetypes much in the same way as our dream characters represent aspects of ourselves". She lists these as Renegade Outpost, Family Garden, Healing Sanctuary, Warrior's Way, Lunatic Fringe, and Lover's Nest.

Art
The event features large sculptural art. One of the signature installations over the years has been an environment entitled Walkabout Woods, which consists of artificial trees constructed by the Fishbon collective. Others have included:
	
Santa Barbara Summer Solstice Floats
Branches Mobile Gallery
BambooDNA
PyroBar
Vajra’s Temple
Space Monkey Creative
Nature Dreamweaver
Symbiotic Creations
Kid’s Karma Zone

Lucid Stage
The Lucid stage, the main music environment at the event, often has both live performers and DJs spinning wide varieties of Electronic Dance Music. The closing performance of one year was Phuture Primitive featuring an array of dancers and an avant-garde drama between an onstage photographer disguised as a spooky computer/robot.

Alive Stage
This alternative acoustic stage features both local and worldly bands, many with jugglers, exotic dance performances or spoken word.

See also

List of electronic music festivals

References

External links

Music festivals established in 2012
Counterculture festivals
Music festivals in California
Transformational festivals
Electronic music festivals in the United States